The Little River, a tributary of the New River, is approximately 65 miles long in southwest Virginia in the United States.

It rises in two forks in Floyd County near the Blue Ridge Parkway. It flows NNW along the Floyd/Montgomery County line and then along the Pulaski/Montgomery County line and joins the New River just downstream from the Claytor Lake dam in Pulaski County near the city of Radford.

The middle and lower portion of this very scenic waterway is suitable for paddling mostly in the spring or after heavy rains.  There are several Class 1,2 rapids and two class 3 rapids and one fairly treacherous Class 4 rapid.  Portions are stocked with trout by the Virginia Division of Game and Inland Fisheries.

See also
List of rivers of Virginia

References

Tributaries of the New River (Kanawha River tributary)
Rivers of Virginia
Rivers of Floyd County, Virginia
Rivers of Montgomery County, Virginia
Rivers of Pulaski County, Virginia